George Wayne Haddad (September 5, 1912 – October 12, 1995) was a car dealer and political figure in British Columbia. He represented Kootenay in the Legislative Assembly of British Columbia from 1975 to 1979 as a Social Credit member.

He was born in Fernie, British Columbia, the son of Abraham Farhat Haddad and Rose Rahal, and was educated in Fernie and Cranbrook. In 1931, Haddad married Elizabeth Ann Foster. He served as mayor of Cranbrook from 1961 to 1969. Haddad was an amateur magician.

References 

British Columbia Social Credit Party MLAs
1912 births
1995 deaths
Mayors of places in British Columbia